Ganugabanda is a village in the Garidepally mandal of Telangana state, India.

References 

Villages in Nalgonda district